Ctenomeristis almella is a species of moth of the family Pyralidae. It is found in Australia.

References

Moths described in 1879
Phycitini
Moths of Australia